This is a list of notable places of worship in Turin, Italy.

Churches

Roman catholic 
 S. Agostino
 Sanctuary of Saint Anthony of Padua
 S. Barbara
 S. Carlo Borromeo
 Chapel of the Holy Shroud
 S. Chiara
 Chiesa della Madonna degli Angeli
 Chiesa della Madonna del Carmine
 Cappella dei Mercanti, Turin
 Chiesa della Misericordia
 Chiesa della Santissima Annunziata
 Chiesa della Visitazione
 Chiesa del Santo Sudario
 Chiesa del Santo Volto
 Church of Jesus of Nazareth
 Church of Mary, Queen of Peace
 Church of Our Lady of Grace
 Church of Our Lady of Health
 Church of Our Lady of Sorrows and Saint Zita
 Church of Saint Martyrs
 Church of the Holy Spirit
 Church of the Immaculate Conception
 Church of the Most Holy Trinity
 Church of the Sacred Heart of Mary
 Church of the Visitation of the Virgin Mary and Saint Barnabas
 Basilica of Corpus Domini
 S. Cristina
 S. Dalmazzo
 S. Domenico
 S. Filippo Neri
 S. Francesco da Paola
 S. Francesco d'Assisi
 S. Gioacchino
 S. Giovanni Evangelista
 S. Giulia
 S. Giuseppe
 Gran Madre di Dio
 S. Lorenzo
 Madonna del Pilone
 S. Maria di Piazza
 S. Massimo
 Basilica Mauriziana
 S. Michele
 Monte dei Cappuccini
 Basilica of Our Lady
 S. Pelagia
 S. Rita da Cascia
 S. Rocco
 S. Salvario
 Santuario della Consolata
 S. Secondo
 Basilica of Superga
 S. Teresa
 S. Tommaso
 Turin Cathedral

Waldensian 
 Waldensian Temple

Eastern Orthodox 
 S. Croce

Synagogues 
 Synagogue of Turin

References 

Turin
Turin-related lists